Dahigaon is a village in the Palghar district of Maharashtra, India. It is located in the Dahanu taluka. Dahigaon is famous for its Jain Temple.

Demographics 
According to the 2011 census of India, Dahigaon has 179 households. The effective literacy rate (i.e. the literacy rate of population excluding children aged 6 and below) is 37.59%.

About Temple
Shri 1008 Mahavir Swami Digambar Jain Atisha Kshetra was built around 200 years ago by Jain muni Mahatisagarji. The moolnayak of this temple is a 5 feet black colored idol of Mahavir Swami in Padmasana posture. Idols of other tirthankars are also present here along with 18 feet idol of Bahubali in kayotsarga (Standing posture) and a 9 feet tall idol made of panch-dhatu (5 metal) dedicated to Rishabh dev.

References

Villages in Dahanu taluka